Bulmosan (불모산 / 佛母山) is a mountain of Gyeongsangnam-do, southeastern South Korea. It has an elevation of 801.7 metres.

There is a KT relay station on top of Bulmosan, visible from the ground.

See also
List of mountains of Korea

References

Mountains of South Korea
Mountains of South Gyeongsang Province